"Keep Your Eye on the Sparrow", also known as "Baretta's Theme", is a song written by Morgan Ames and Dave Grusin, recorded by multiple artists during the summer of 1975. Merry Clayton's version was the first to chart, reaching #45 on the U.S. Billboard Hot 100.

A version by Rhythm Heritage became a Top 20 hit in 1976. The band recorded it as a semi-instrumental number, with subdued vocals by Oren and Luther Waters.  It was selected as the theme to the TV show Baretta, starring Robert Blake.  "Baretta's Theme" was released as a single in the spring of 1976, reaching #20 on the U.S. Billboard Hot 100 and #15 in Canada.

Chart history
Merry Clayton

Sammy Davis Jr.

Rhythm Heritage ("Baretta's Theme")

Other versions
 The Latin band El Chicano covered the song on their 1975 LP Pyramid of Love and Friends.
 Sammy Davis Jr.'s version of "Keep Your Eye on the Sparrow" was released in 1976.  It reached #101 on the Billboard Bubbling Under chart.

References

External links
 
 
 

Sammy Davis Jr. songs
1975 songs
1975 singles
1976 singles
Television drama theme songs
Ode Records singles
ABC Records singles
Pye Records singles
Song recordings produced by Mike Curb